Bhuchoki Mahja is a village near Raiwind, Pakistan. Its population is almost 10,000. It was a part of union council 33 but recently it merged with union council 274.

There are no water or sewage or medical facilities and travel infrastructure is poor. Domestic gas has been announce and supply by Malik Afzal Khokar Membor national assembly. Its current mayor is Rao Shahbaz Hayat Khan of the Pakistan Muslim League.

References

Cities in Pakistan